Néstor Ezequiel Ortigoza (born 7 October 1984) is a professional football central midfielder, who currently plays for San Lorenzo de Almagro. Born in Argentina, he represented the Paraguay national team.

Club career
Ortigoza started his career in 2004, playing for Argentinos Juniors. In 2005, he had a brief loan spell with Nueva Chicago before returning to Argentinos. In 2007, he began to establish himself as an important member of the first team squad and in 2009 he became a near permanent fixture in the first team squad after the appointment of Claudio Borghi as the manager of Argentinos Juniors.

Ortigoza was an important member of the Argentinos Juniors team that won the Clausura 2010 championship. He played in 17 of the club's 19 games and scored 3 goals during their championship winning campaign been their captain and was selected Footballer of the Year in Argentina.

In 2011, San Lorenzo bought the entire move from Argentinos Juniors for $2,200,000 and signed the player for three seasons.

In July 2012, Ortigoza signed a one-year loan contract with Emirates Club in the United Arab Emirates.

In December 2017, Ortigoza signed with Rosario Central from Olimpia.

After a half year at Estudiantes de Río Cuarto, it was rumored that Ortigoza had moved to Bolivian club Club Atlético Ciclón in September 2020. However, this wasn't true and Ortigoza stayed at Estudiantes.

International career
Ortigoza's father is Paraguayan, meaning that the Paraguay national football team's coach Gerardo Martino had the interest of Ortigoza playing for the Paraguay national team due to Ortigoza is entitled to request Paraguayan citizenship.

On 8 April 2009 he obtained Paraguayan nationality, which enabled him to play for the Paraguay national team.
Ortigoza was called to the Paraguay national football team for the Qualification matches against Venezuela and Colombia. He played in the World Cup 2010 in South Africa. On 14 October 2014, he scored his first goal in a 1–2 friendly away defeat against China.

International goal
Scores and results list Paraguay's goal tally first.

Style of play
Néstor Ortigoza is known for stocky, physical build, and his ability to win the ball as a central midfielder. His range of distribution and his slow-paced, intelligent, precise passing game also enable him to influence games from deeper positions in midfield, where he can set the tempo of his team's play and orchestrate attacking moves. He is also a penalty kick specialist.

Honours
Argentinos Juniors
Argentine Primera División: 2010 Clausura

San Lorenzo
Argentine Primera División: 2013 Inicial
Copa Libertadores: 2014
Supercopa Argentina: 2015

Rosario Central
Copa Argentina: 2018

References

External links
 
 Football lineups player profile
 
 Argentine Primera statistics 
 

1984 births
Living people
Citizens of Paraguay through descent
Paraguayan footballers
Paraguay international footballers
Argentine footballers
Argentine sportspeople of Paraguayan descent
Sportspeople from Buenos Aires Province
Paraguayan expatriate footballers
Association football midfielders
2010 FIFA World Cup players
2011 Copa América players
2015 Copa América players
Expatriate footballers in Argentina
Argentinos Juniors footballers
Nueva Chicago footballers
San Lorenzo de Almagro footballers
Emirates Club players
Club Olimpia footballers
Rosario Central footballers
Estudiantes de Río Cuarto footballers
Argentine Primera División players
UAE First Division League players
Paraguayan Primera División players
Argentine emigrants to Paraguay
Expatriate footballers in the United Arab Emirates